Bellinger is a masculine given name. Notable people with the name include:

Peter Bellinger Brodie (1815-1897), English geologist
Peter Bellinger Brodie (conveyancer) (1778-1854), English lawyer
William Bellinger Bulloch (1777-1852), American politician

Masculine given names